Richaud is a surname. Notable people with the surname include:

Étienne Richaud, Governor General for Inde française in the Second French Colonial Empire under Third Republic
André de Richaud (1909–1961), French poet and writer
Benoît Richaud (born 1988), French ice dancer
Paul Marie André Richaud (1887–1968), French Cardinal of the Roman Catholic Church